Harold Dana Gregg (July 11, 1921 – May 13, 1991) was a starting pitcher in Major League Baseball who played for the Brooklyn Dodgers (1943–47), Pittsburgh Pirates (1948–50) and New York Giants (1952). Gregg batted and threw right-handed. He was born in Anaheim, California.

In a nine-season career, Gregg posted a 40–48 record with 401 strikeouts and a 4.54 ERA in 827 innings pitched.

In 1947 Gregg became an unlikely World Series figure. He had pitched very well in relief for Brooklyn, especially in the 4th game when Bill Bevens was hurling his 8 innings of no-hit ball only to lose in the 9th. Gregg relieved the starter in the 1st, got out of the jam with no runs, and pitched 7 innings holding the Yankees to 2 runs, working out of some more tough jams and keeping Brooklyn in the game. Since Brooklyn's manager had completely mishandled the pitching staff, continually using starters in relief, there was only Gregg ready to start game 7; Gregg thus joined some of the few but greatest pitchers in history who have started a World Series 7th game. Gregg, on two days' rest, lost, giving up 3 runs in 4 innings. He threw 12 innings in the series with 10 strikeouts including DiMaggio, who seldom struck out.

He was a better than average hitting pitcher in his career, compiling a .205 batting average (54-for-263) with 26 runs, 2 home runs and 15 RBI.

Gregg died in Bishop, California, at age of 69.

Best season
: 18 wins, 34 starts, 13 complete games, 139 strikeouts, 254 innings – all career-highs

Highlights
Was the winning pitcher against the Boston Braves, 5–3, during the historic debut of Jackie Robinson with the Brooklyn Dodgers (April 15, 1947)
Pitched a one-hit, 1–0 shutout against the Philadelphia Phillies at Ebbets Field (April 22, 1947)
The 1947 World Series. He led all Brooklyn pitchers in innings pitched and strikeouts with a memorable 4th game: 7IP, 4H 1R.

References

External links

Baseball Almanac
Hal Gregg Biography at Baseball Biography

National League All-Stars
Brooklyn Dodgers players
New York Giants (NL) players
Pittsburgh Pirates players
Major League Baseball pitchers
Baseball players from Anaheim, California
1921 births
1991 deaths
Santa Barbara Saints players
Olean Oilers players
Washington Red Birds players
Montreal Royals players
San Francisco Seals (baseball) players
Indianapolis Indians players
Oakland Oaks (baseball) players